The Gramophone Classical Music Awards, launched in 1977, are one of the most significant honours bestowed on recordings in the classical record industry. They are often viewed as equivalent to or surpassing the American Grammy award, and referred to as the Oscars for classical music. They are widely regarded as the most influential and prestigious classical music awards in the world. According to Matthew Owen, national sales manager for Harmonia Mundi USA, "ultimately it is the classical award, especially worldwide."

The winners are selected annually by critics for the Gramophone magazine and various members of the industry, including retailers, broadcasters, arts administrators, and musicians. Awards are usually presented in September each year in London.

Gramophone Awards of the 2020s

2021 
Source:
 Chamber: Beach. Elgar Piano Quintets (Takács Quartet; Garrick Ohlsson)
 Choral: Dussek Messe Solemnelle (Stefanie True, Helen Charlston, Gwilym Bowen, Morgan Pearse, Choir of the AAM, Academy of Ancient Music / Richard Egarr)
 Concerto: Shostakovich Violin Concertos (Alina Ibragimova; State Academic Symphony Orchestra of Russia 'Evgeny Svetlanov' / Vladimir Jurowski)
 Contemporary: John Pickard The Gardener of Aleppo and other chamber works (Susan Bickley; Nash Ensemble / Martyn Brabbins)
 Early Music: Josquin Masses – Hercules Dux Ferrarie, D'ung aultre amer & Missa Faysant regretz (The Tallis Scholars / Peter Phillips)
 Instrumental: Bach Lute Suites (Sean Shibe)
 Opera & Recording of the Year: Britten Peter Grimes (Stuart Skelton, Erin Wall, Roderick Williams, Susan Bickley, Catherine Wyn-Rogers, Robert Murray, James Gilchrist, Marcus Farnsworth; Bergen Philharmonic Orchestra and Choirs / Edward Gardner)
 Orchestral: Franz Schmidt Complete Symphonies (Frankfurt Radio Symphony Orchestra / Paavo Järvi)
 Piano: JS Bach Well-Tempered Clavier, Book 2 – Excerpts (Piotr Anderszewski)
 Song: 'El Nour' (Fatma Said, Malcolm Martineau, Rafael Aguirre, Burcu Karadağ, Itamar Doari, Henning Sieverts, Tamer Pinarbasi, Vision String Quartet)
 Voice & Ensemble: Verdi (Ludovic Tézier; Orchestra del Teatro Comunale di Bologna / Frédéric Chaslin)
 Label of the Year: Deutsche Grammophon
 Lifetime Achievement: Gundula Janowitz
 Young Artist of the Year: 
 Spatial Audio: The Golden Renaissance: Josquin Des Prez (Stile Antico)
 Concept Album: Cello 360 (Christian-Pierre La Marca)
 Artist of the Year: James Ehnes
 Special Achievement: Boston Modern Orchestra Project
 Orchestra of the Year: Minnesota Orchestra

2020 
Source.

Lifetime Achievement: Itzhak Perlman
Special Achievement: Robert von Bahr 
Orchestra of the Year: Philadelphia Orchestra
Artist of the Year: Igor Levit
Young Artist of the Year: Natalya Romaniw
Label of the Year: Alpha Classics
Beethoven 250 Award: Beethoven: Piano Concertos 2 & 5. Martin Helmchen, Deutsches Symphonie-Orchester, Andrew Manze (Alpha Classics)
Concerto: Chopin: Piano Concertos. Benjamin Grosvenor; Royal Scottish National Orchestra, Elim Chan (Decca)
Chamber: Bartok: Piano Quintet. Veress: Piano Trio. Vilde Frang; Barnabás Kelemen; Katalin Kokas; Lawrence Power; Nicolas Altstaedt; Alexander Lonquich (Alpha Classics)
Choral: Bach: St. Matthew Passion. Bach Collegium Japan / Masaaki Suzuki (BIS Records)
Concept Album of the Year: From the Ground Up: The Chaconne. Hugo Ticciati, O/Modernt Chamber Orchestra(Signum Classics)
Contemporary: Thomas Adès: Piano Concerto / Totentanz Kirill Gerstein; Mark Stone; Christianne Stotijn; Boston Symphony Orchestra / Thomas Adès  (Deutsche Grammophon)
Early Music: Gesualdo: Madrigali, Libri primo & secondo   Les Arts Florissants, Paul Agnew  (Harmonia Mundi)
Instrumental: Beethoven: Complete Piano Sonatas. Igor Levit   (Sony Classical)
Opera: Handel: Agrippina Joyce DiDonato, Il Pomo d'Oro, Maxim Emelyanychev (Erato)
Recording of the Year (Orchestral): Weinberg: Symphonies 2 & 21, City of Birmingham Symphony Orchestra, Kremerata Baltica, Mirga Gražinytė-Tyla (Deutsche Grammophon)
Recital: Sandrine Piau, Le Concert de la Loge, Julien Chauvin 
Solo Vocal: Janáček: The diary of one who disappeared, etc. Nicky Spence, Julius Drake (Hyperion)

Gramophone Awards of the 2010s

2019 
Source.

Lifetime Achievement: Emma Kirkby
Orchestra of the Year: Hong Kong Philharmonic Orchestra
Artist of the Year: Víkingur Ólafsson
Young Artist of the Year: Jakub Józef Orliński
Label of the Year: Pentatone
Recording of the Year (Concerto): Saint-Saëns: Piano Concertos #2 and #5. Bertrand Chamayou, Orchestre National de France (Erato Records)
Chamber: Debussy: Les Trois Sonates: The Late Works. Isabelle Faust, Alexander Melnikov, Tanguy de Williencourt, Magali Mosnier, Antoine Tamestit, Xavier de Maistre, Jean-Guihen Queyras, Javier Perianes (Harmonia Mundi)
Choral: Buxtehude: Abendmusiken. Ensemble Masques / Olivier Fortin, Vox Luminis / Lionel Meunier (Alpha Classics)
Concept Album of the Year: softLOUD: Music for Acoustic and Electric Guitars. Sean Shibe. (Delphian Records)
Contemporary: Brett Dean: Hamlet. Allan Clayton, Sarah Connolly, Barbara Hannigan, Rod Gilfry, Kim Begley, John Tomlinson, Jacques Imbrailo, London Philharmonic Orchestra, Glyndebourne Chorus / Vladimir Jurowski (Opus Arte)
Early Music: Manuel Cardoso: Requiem Lamentations, Magnificat and Motets. Cupertinos / Luis Toscano (Hyperion)
Instrumental: The Berlin Recital. Yuja Wang (Deutsche Grammophon)
Opera: Halévy: La Reine de Chype. Orchestre de Chambre de Paris / Hervé Niquet, Chœur de la radio flamande (Bru Zane).
Orchestral: Rued Langgaard: Symphonies 2 & 6. Vienna Philharmonic / Sakari Oramo (Dacapo)
Recital: Cavalli: Ombra mai fu, Ensemble Artaserse / Philippe Jaroussky (Erato)
Solo Vocal: Schumann: Frage. Christian Gerhaher and Gerold Huber (Sony Classical).

2018 
Source.

Lifetime Achievement: Neeme Järvi
Orchestra of the Year: Seattle Symphony
Artist of the Year: Rachel Podger
Young Artist of the Year: Lise Davidsen
Label of the Year: Harmonia Mundi
Recording of the Year (Opera): Berlioz: Les Troyens. Joyce DiDonato, Michael Spyres, Marie-Nicole Lemieux, Orchestre philharmonique de Strasbourg / John Nelson (Erato Records)
Chamber: Dvořák: Quintets Op. 81 & 97. Boris Giltburg, Pavel Nikl, Pavel Haas Quartet (Supraphon)
Choral: Pärt: Magnificat, Nunc dimittis; Schnittke: Psalms of Repentance. Estonian Philharmonic Chamber Choir / Kaspars Putniņš (BIS Records)
Concerto: Bartók: Violin Concertos Nos. 1 & 2. Christian Tetzlaff, Finnish Radio Symphony Orchestra / Hannu Lintu (Ondine)
Contemporary: Pascal Dusapin: String Quartets Nos 6 & 7. Arditti Quartet, Orchestre philharmonique de Radio France / Pascal Rophé (Aeon)
Early Music: Music from the Peterhouse Partbooks, Vol 5. Blue Heron / Scott Metcalfe (Blue Heron)
Instrumental: Brahms Piano Pieces, Opp. 76, 117 & 118. Arcadi Volodos (Sony Classical)
Orchestral: Ravel Daphnis et Chloé: Ensemble Aedes; Les Siècles / François-Xavier Roth (Harmonia Mundi)
Recital: Agitata: Delphine Galou, Accademia Bizantina / Ottavio Dantone (Alpha Classics)
Solo Vocal: Secrets: Marianne Crebassa; Fazıl Say (Erato)

2017 
Source.

Concerto & Recording of the Year: Mozart Violin Concertos Nos 1–5. Adagio, K261. Rondos – K269; K373 / Isabelle Faust (violin) / Il Giardino Armonico / Giovanni Antonini
Baroque Instrumental: ‘The Italian Job’ / La Serenissima / Adrian Chandler (violin)
Baroque Vocal: JS Bach Cantatas Nos 54, 82 & 170 / Iestyn Davies counterten / Arcangelo / Jonathan Cohen
Chamber: Grażyna Bacewicz Complete String Quartets / Silesian Quartet
Choral: Mozart Mass in C minor, K427. Exsultate, jubilate, K165 / Carolyn Sampson (soprano) / Olivia Vermeulen (mezzo) / Makoto Sakurada (tenor) / Christian Immler (baritone) / Bach Collegium Japan / Masaaki Suzuki
Contemporary: G Benjamin Palimpsests / Ligeti Lontano / Murail Le désenchantement du monde / Pierre-Laurent Aimard (piano) / Bavarian Radio Symphony Orchestra / Sir George Benjamin
Early Music: Dowland Lachrimae, or Seaven Teares / Phantasm with Elizabeth Kenny (lute)
Instrumental: JS Bach Six French Suites, BWV812-817 / Murray Perahia (piano)
Orchestral: ‘Haydn 2032 – No 4, Il distratto’ / Riccardo Novaro bar / Il Giardino Armonico / Giovanni Antonini
Recital: ‘In War & Peace’ / Joyce DiDonato (mezzo) / Il Pomo d’Oro / Maxim Emelyanychev (harpsichord)
Solo Vocal: Brahms Lieder und Gesänge, Op 32. Vier ernste Gesänge, Op 121. Lieder nach Gedichten von Heinrich Heine / Matthias Goerne (baritone) / Christoph Eschenbach (piano)
Anniversary Award: Classic FM
Artist of the Year: Vasily Petrenko
Label of the Year: Signum Classics
Lifetime Achievement: Dame Kiri Te Kanawa
Special Achievement: Colin Matthews
Young Artist of the Year: Beatrice Rana

2016

Lifetime Achievement – Mezzo-soprano Christa Ludwig
Recording of the Year – Igor Levit piano JS Bach Goldberg Variations Beethoven Diabelli Variations Rzewski The People United Will Never Be Defeated!
Artist of the Year – Daniil Trifonov
Label of the Year – Warner Classics
Orchestral – Shostakovich Symphony No 10 Boston Symphony Orchestra / Andris Nelsons
Special Achievement – BBC Radio 3
Young Artist of the Year – Benjamin Appl
Baroque Instrumental – Biber Rosary Sonatas, Rachel Podger (violin) with Jonathan Manson (cello), (viol), David Miller (archlute), Marcin Swiatkiewicz (harps), (organ)
Baroque Vocal – Monteverdi, Madrigali, Vol 1 – Cremona – Les Arts Florissants / Paul Agnew
Chamber – Tippett String Quartets Heath Quartet
Choral – Schoenberg Gurrelieder – Barbara Haveman (soprano) Claudia Mahnke (mezzo) Brandon Jovanovich, Gerhard Siegel (tenors) Thomas Bauer (baritone) Johannes Martin Kränzle (speaker); Netherlands Female Youth Choir; Cologne Cathedral Choir, Male Voices and Vocal Ensemble; Chorus of the Bach-Verein, Cologne; Kartäuserkantorei, Cologne; Cologne Gürzenich Orchestra / Markus Stenz
Concerto – Britten. Korngold Violin Concertos – Vilde Frang (violin), Frankfurt Radio Symphony Orchestra / James Gaffigan
Contemporary – Hans Abrahamsen let me tell you – Barbara Hannigan (soprano) Bavarian Radio Symphony Orchestra / Andris Nelsons
Early Music – John Taverner Western Wind Taverner Choir & Players / Andrew Parrott
Instrumental – Igor Levit piano JS Bach Goldberg Variations Beethoven Diabelli Variations Rzewski The People United Will Never Be Defeated!
Opera – Verdi Aida – Anja Harteros soprano Aida Jonas Kaufmann tenor Radamès Ekaterina Semenchuk mezzo Amneris Ludovic Tézier baritone Amonasro Erwin Schrott bass-baritone Ramfis Marco Spotti bass King of Egypt Eleonora Buratto soprano Priestess Paolo Fanale tenor Messenger Chorus and Orchestra of the Accademia Nazionale di Santa Cecilia / Sir Antonio Pappano
Recital – Mozart – The Weber Sisters – Sabine Devieilhe soprano Arnaud de Pasquale piano/organ Ensemble Pygmalion / Raphaël Pichon
Solo Vocal – Néère – Véronique Gens (soprano), Susan Manoff (piano)

2015
Recording of the Year – Bruckner Symphony No 9 Lucerne Festival Orchestra / Claudio Abbado, DG
Artist of the Year – Paavo Järvi
Label of the Year – Channel Classics
Lifetime Achievement – Bernard Haitink
Young Artist of the Year – Joseph Moog
Baroque Instrumental – JS Bach Cello Suites, David Watkin (cello)
Baroque Vocal – Monteverdi Vespri solenni per la festa di San Marco Concerto Italiano / Rinaldo Alessandrini
Chamber – Smetana String Quartets No 1, 'From my life' & 2 Pavel Haas Quartet
Choral – Elgar The Dream of Gerontius. Sea Pictures, Sarah Connolly (mezzo), Stuart Skelton (tenor), David Soar (bass), BBC SO and Chorus / Sir Andrew Davis (Chandos)
Concerto – Beethoven Piano Concertos Nos 3 & 4, Maria João Pires (piano), Swedish Radio Symphony Orchestra / Daniel Harding
Contemporary – Nørgård Symphonies Nos 1 & 8, Vienna Philharmonic / Sakari Oramo
Early Music – 'The Spy's Choirbook' Alamire; English Cornett and Sackbut Ensemble / David Skinner (Obsidian)
Instrumental – English Suites Nos 1, 3 & 5 Piotr Anderszewski piano (Warner Classics)
Opera – R Strauss Elektra; Soloists; Orchestre de Paris / Esa-Pekka Salonen, Patrice Chéreau (Stage director), Stéphane Metge (Video director) (Bel Air Classique)
Recital – A French Baroque Diva, Carolyn Sampson (soprano), Ex Cathedra / Jeffrey Skidmore (Hyperion)
Solo Vocal – Schubert Nachtviolen, Christian Gerhaher (baritone), Gerold Huber (piano) (Sony Classical)

2014
Artist of the Year – Leonidas Kavakos
Young Artist of the Year – Nightingale String Quartet
Lifetime Achievement Award – James Galway
Outstanding Achievement Award – Neville Marriner
Label of the Year – Delphian
Recording of the Year – Brahms, "The Symphonies". Leipzig Gewandhaus Orchestra, Riccardo Chailly. Decca.
Baroque Instrumental – CPE Bach, "Württemberg" Sonatas. Mahan Esfahani (harpsichord). Hyperion.
Baroque Vocal – CPE Bach, Magnificat, Heilig ist Gott and Symphony in D major. Elizabeth Watts, Wiebke Lehmkuhl, Lothar Odinius and Markus Eiche (soloists) with the RIAS Kammerchor and Akademie für Alte Musik Berlin directed by Hans-Christoph Rademann. Harmonia Mundi.
Chamber – Schubert, String Quintet D956 and String Quartet No. 14 ("Death and the Maiden") D810. Pavel Haas Quartet with Danjulo Ishizaka (cello). Supraphon.
Choral – Mozart, Requiem K626 and Misericordias Domini K222. Joanne Lunn, Rowan Hellier, Thomas Hobbs and Matthew Brook (soloists) with the Dunedin Consort directed by John Butt. Linn.
Concerto – Prokofiev Complete Piano Concertos. Jean-Efflam Bavouzet with the BBC Philharmonic Orchestra directed by Gianandrea Noseda. Chandos
Contemporary – George Benjamin, Written on Skin (DVD). Christopher Purves, Barbara Hannigan, Bejun Mehta, Victoria Simmonds and Allan Clayton (soloists) with the Orchestra of the Royal Opera House, Covent Garden, conducted by George Benjamin, stage director Katie Mitchell, video director Margaret Williams. Opus Arte
Early Music – Marenzio, Primo libro di madrigali. La Compagnia del Madrigale. Glossa.
Instrumental – "Volodos plays Mompou", Arcadi Volodos (piano). Sony Classical.
Opera – Ravel, L'heure espagnole and L'enfant et les sortilèges (DVD). Stéphanie d'Oustrac, Alek Shrader, François Piolino, Elliot Madore, Paul Gay, Khatouna Gadelia and Elodie Méchain (soloists) with the Glyndebourne Chorus and London Philharmonic Orchestra conducted by Kazushi Ono, stage director Laurent Pelly, video director François Roussillon. FRA Musica DVD.
Orchestral – Brahms, "The Symphonies". Leipzig Gewandhaus Orchestra, Riccardo Chailly. Decca.
Recital – "Arise, my muse", various composers. Iestyn Davies (countertenor), Richard Egarr and Friends. Wigmore Hall Live.
Vocal – Schubert, Winterreise. Jonas Kaufmann (ten), Helmut Deutsch (piano). Sony Classical.

2013

Artist of the Year – Alison Balsom
Young Artist of the Year – Jan Lisiecki
Lifetime Achievement Award – Julian Bream
Label of the Year – Decca Classics
Baroque Instrumental – Froberger, D'Anglebert, Fischer, Louis Couperin. Andreas Staier. Harmonia Mundi
Baroque Vocal – Bach Motets. Monteverdi Choir, English Baroque Soloists. John Eliot Gardiner. Soli Deo Gloria
Chamber – Bartók Violin Sonatas 1 & 2, Sonata for Solo Violin. Barnabás Kelemen, Zoltán Kocsis. Hungaroton
Choral – Elgar The Apostles. Rebecca Evans, Alice Coote, Paul Groves, Jacques Imbrailo, David Kempster, Brindley Sherratt, Halle Orchestra Sir Mark Elder.
Concerto (Record of the Year) – Bartók Violin Concerto No. 2, Eötvös Seven, Ligeti Violin Concerto. Patricia Kopatchinskaja, HR Sinfonieorchester, Ensemble Modern. Peter Eotvos. Naive
Contemporary – Dutilleux . Barbara Hannigan, Anssi Karttunen, Orchestre Philharmonique de Radio France. Esa-Pekka Salonen. Deutsche Grammophon
Early Music – A New Venetian Coronation 1595 Gabrieli Consort & Players. Paul McCreesh. Signum Records
Instrumental – Mussorgsky Pictures from an Exhibition, Prokofiev Sarcasms, Visions fugitives. Steven Osborne. Hyperion
Opera – Puccini Il Trittico. Eva-Maria Westbroek, Ermonela Jaho, Lucio Gallo, Elena Zilio, Francesco Demuro, Royal Opera Chorus, Orchestra of the Royal Opera House, Richard Jones. Antonio Pappano. Opus Arte 3 DVD
Orchestral – Suk Prague, A Summer's Tale Op. 29 BBC Symphony Orchestra Jiří Bělohlávek. Chandos
Vocal – Wagner Arias. Jonas Kaufmann, Orchester der Deutschen Oper Berlin. Donald Runnicles. Decca

2012
Lifetime Achievement Claudio Abbado
Artist of the Year – Joseph Calleja
Young Artist of the Year – Benjamin Grosvenor
Label of the Year – Naïve Records
Baroque Vocal (Record of the Year) – Heinrich Schütz: Musikalische Exequien, Vox Luminis, Lionel Meunier (RICERCAR)
Early – Victoria Sacred works, Ensemble Plus Ultra, Michael Noone ARCHIV (DG)
Baroque Instrumental – Bach: Orchestral Suites, Freiburg Baroque Orchestra, Petra Mullejans, Gottfried von der Goltz (HARMONIA MUNDI)
DVD Documentary – Music makes a city, A film by Oswald Brown III; Jerome Hiler (Harmonia Mundi)
DVD Performance – Claudio Abbado & Lucerne Festival Orchestra: Bruckner 5 (Accentus)
Opera – Beethoven: Fidelio, Stemme; Kaufmann; Lucerne Festival Orchestra / Claudio Abbado (DECCA)
Choral – Howells: Requiem, St Paul's Magnificat and Nunc dimittis, Choir of Trinity College, Cambridge / Stephen Layton (HYPERION)
Special Achievement – Smetana: Ma vlast, with Czech National Anthem Czech Philharmonic Orchestra / Václav Talich ( historical Norwegian Radio recording in Nazi-occupied Prague on 5 June 1939, remastering producer Matouš Vlčinský) (Supraphon)
Instrumental – Chopin. Liszt, Ravel: Piano works, Benjamin Grosvenor (Decca Records)
Concerto – Beethoven, Berg: Violin Concertos, Isabelle Faust, Orchestra Mozart / Claudio Abbado (Harmonia Mundi)
Solo Vocal – Songs of War, Simon Keenlyside Malcolm Martineau (Sony CLASSICAL)
Historic – Chopin: Etudes, Maurizio Pollini (TESTAMENT)
Orchestral – Martinu Symphonies; BBC SO, Jiri Belohlavek (Onyx)
Contemporary – Rautavaara: Percussion Concerto, Cello Concerto No 2, Modificata, Colin Currie (percussion) Truls Mørk (cello) Helsinki Philharmonic Orchestra / John Storgårds (Ondine)
Chamber – Schumann: Complete works for piano trio, Christian Tetzlaff (violin) Tanja Tetzlaff (cello) Leif Ove Andsnes (piano) (EMI)

2011
Artist of the Year – Gustavo Dudamel, conductor
Specialist Classical Chart – Miloš Karadaglić – The Guitar
Label of the Year – Wigmore Hall Live
Young Artist of the Year – Miloš Karadaglić
Special Achievement – The Bach Cantata Pilgrimage on SDG
Lifetime Achievement – Dame Janet Baker, mezzo-soprano
Music in the Community Award – The Cobweb Orchestra
Baroque Instrumental – CPE Bach Harpsichord Concertos Andreas Staier; Freiburg Baroque / Petra Müllejans Harmonia Mundi
Baroque Vocal – Handel Apollo e Dafne La Risonanza Glossa
Chamber (Record of the Year) – Dvořák String Quartets Op. 106 & 96 Pavel Haas Quartet Supraphon
Choral – Elgar The Kingdom Claire Rutter; Susan Bickley; John Hudson; Iain Paterson; Hallé Choir & Orchestra / Sir Mark Elder
Concerto – Debussy Fantaisie Ravel Piano Concertos Massenet Piano works Jean-Efflam Bavouzet; BBC Symphony Orchestra / Yan Pascal Tortelier Chandos
Contemporary – Birtwistle Night's Black Bird Hallé Orchestra / Ryan Wigglesworth NMC
DVD Documentary – Carlos Kleiber: Traces to Nowhere A film by Eric Schultz Arthaus
DVD Performance – Verdi Don Carlo Soloists; Chorus and Orchestra of the Royal Opera House, Covent Garden / Antonio Pappano EMI Classics
Early Music – Striggio Mass in 40 Parts etc. I Fagiolini et al. / Robert Hollingworth Decca
Historic – Mahler/Cooke Symphony No 10 London Symphony Orchestra, Philharmonia / Berthold Goldschmidt
Instrumental – Brahms Handel Variations. Piano works, Op 118 & 119 Murray Perahia Sony Classical
Opera – Rossini Ermione Soloists; Geoffrey Mitchell Choir; London Philharmonic Orchestra / David Parry Opera Rara
Orchestral – Shostakovich Symphony No 10 RLPO / Vasily Petrenko Naxos
Recital – Verismo Arias Various Jonas Kaufmann; Chorus and Orchestra of the Santa Cecilia Academy, Rome / Antonio Pappano Decca Classics
Solo vocal – Britten Songs and Proverbs of William Blake Gerald Finley; Julius Drake Hyperion
Editor's Choice – Rossini Stabat Mater Netrebko; Santa Cecilia Orchestra & Choir / Antonio Pappano EMI

2010
Complete list

Artist of the Year – Joyce DiDonato
Lifetime Achievement Award – Alfred Brendel
Young Artist of the Year – Sol Gabetta
Label of the Year – Linn Records
Early Music (Record of the Year) – Byrd 'Infelix Ego' / The Cardinall's Musick and Andrew Carwood
Baroque Instrumental – Vivaldi The French Connection / La Serenissima
Chamber – Beethoven, Sonatas for Piano and Violin / Isabelle Faust
Concerto – Elgar, Violin Concerto, Thomas Zehetmair; Hallé Orchestra / Sir Mark Elder
Contemporary – Adès – The Tempest Soloists; Chorus and Orchestra of the Royal Opera House, Covent Garden / Thomas Adès DVD – Leonard Bernstein – Reflections, film by Peter Rosen
Historic Archive – Beethoven – 32 Piano Sonatas. Eroica Variations etc. Friedrich Gulda
Opera – Wagner – Götterdämmerung. Soloists; Choruses; Hallé Orchestra / Sir Mark Elder
Orchestral – Dvořák – Symphonic Poems. Czech Philharmonic / Sir Charles Mackerras. Supraphon SU4012-2
Editors Choice : Bernstein's Mass, Marin Alsop

Gramophone Awards of the 2000s

2009
Artist of the Year – The Sixteen
Lifetime Achievement Award – Nikolaus Harnoncourt
Young Artist of the Year – Yuja Wang
Special Achievement – Bernard Coutaz, founder of Harmonia Mundi
Label of the Year – ECM
Early Music – Song of Songs, Stile Antico
Classic FM Award for Audience Innovation – Royal Opera House and The Sun
Baroque Instrumental – Henry Purcell's Complete Fantazias / Fretwork
Chamber (Record of the Year) – Debussy, Fauré and Ravel, String quartets, Quatuor Ebène
Concerto – Britten, Piano Concerto, Steven Osborne, BBC Scottish Symphony Orchestra / Ilan Volkov (Hyperion)
Contemporary – The NMC Songbook, various artists (NMC)
DVD – Wagner, The Copenhagen Ring, The Royal Danish Opera / Michael Schønwandt
Historic Archive – Berlioz, Les Troyens, Covent Garden Opera / Rafael Kubelík
Opera – Puccini, Madama Butterfly, Accademia Nazionale di Santa Cecilia / Antonio Pappano, Angela Gheorghiu (sop)
Orchestral – Tchaikovsky, Manfred Symphony & The Vayevoda, Royal Liverpool Philharmonic / Vasily Petrenko
Editors Choice : Beethoven: Diabelli Variations & Bach: Partita No. 4 – Stephen Kovacevich (piano)

2008
Artist of the Year – Hilary Hahn
Lifetime Achievement – André Previn
Young Artist of the Year – Maxim Rysanov
Special Achievement – Sir Peter Moores
Label of the Year – Hyperion
The Gold Disc – Saint-Saëns: Piano Concertos – Stephen Hough
Classic FM Award for Audience Innovation – Tasmin Little
Baroque Instrumental – Brandenburg concertos European Brandenburg Ensemble / Trevor Pinnock (Avie)
Chamber – Brahms and Schumann, Piano quintets, Leif Ove Andsnes, Artemis Quartet (Virgin Classics)
Concerto – Elgar, Violin Concerto, James Ehnes, Philharmonia Orchestra / Sir Andrew Davis (Onyx)
DVD – Mozart, Le nozze di Figaro Soloists, The Royal Opera / Antonio Pappano (Opus Arte)
Historic Archive – Vaughan Williams, Symphony No 5 London Philharmonic Orchestra / Vaughan Williams (Somm)
Opera – Janáček, The Excursions of Mr Broucek BBC Symphony Orchestra / Jirí Belohlávek (Deutsche Grammophon)
Recital – Maria, Cecilia Bartoli, Orchestra La Scintilla / Ádám Fischer (Decca)
Instrumental (Record of the Year) – Beethoven, Piano Sonatas, Vol 4 Paul Lewis (Harmonia Mundi)
Baroque Vocal – Monteverdi, L'Orfeo, La Venexiana / Claudio Cavina (Glossa)
Choral – Haydn, The Creation, Soloists, Gabrieli Consort and Players / Paul McCreesh (Archiv Produktion)
Contemporary – Jonathan Harvey, Body Mandala, Anu Komsi, BBC Scottish Symphony Orchestra / Ilan Volkov (NMC)
Early Music – Nicholas Ludford, Missa Benedicta, Choir of New College, Oxford / Edward Higginbottom (K617)
Historic Reissue – Sibelius, Songs, Kim Borg, Erik Werba (Deutsche Grammophon)
Orchestral – Myaskovsky, Symphonies, USSR State & Russian Federation Symphony Orchestras / Evgeny Svetlanov (Warner Classics)
Solo vocal – Barber, Songs, Gerald Finley, Julius Drake, (Hyperion)
Editor's Choice – Mr Abel's Fine Airs

2007
Artist of the Year – Julia Fischer
Lifetime Achievement – Montserrat Caballé
Young Artist of the Year – Vasily Petrenko
Special Achievement – Christopher Raeburn
Label of the Year – Deutsche Grammophon
Concerto (Record of the Year) – Brahms Piano Concertos Nelson Freire; Leipzig Gewandhaus Orchestra / Riccardo Chailly (Decca)
Editor's Choice – Mahler Symphony No. 2 Budapest Festival Orchestra / Ivan Fischer (Channel Classics)
Baroque instrumental – Handel Concerti Grossi Academy of Ancient Music / Richard Egarr (Harmonia Mundi)
Baroque vocal – Handel Messiah (Dublin version, 1742); Dunedin Consort & Players / John Butt (Linn Records)
Chamber – Haas and Janáček String Quartets Pavel Haas Quartet (Supraphon)
Choral – Brahms Ein Deutsches Requiem Dorothea Röschmann; Thomas Quasthoff; Berlin Radio Choir; Berlin Philharmonic Orchestra / Sir Simon Rattle (EMI)
Contemporary – Julian Anderson Alhambra Fantasy BBC Symphony Orchestra / Oliver Knussen (Ondine)
DVD – Julian Bream: My Life in Music(Avie)
Early music – Byrd Laudibus in sanctis The Cardinall's Musick / Andrew Carwood (Hyperion)
Historic reissue – Moeran Symphony in G minor etc. London Philharmonic Orchestra, New Philharmonia / Sir Adrian Boult (Lyrita)
History archive – Wagner Götterdämmerung Bayreuth Festival Opera / Joseph Keilberth (Testament)
Instrumental – Bach Cello Suites, Steven Isserlis (Hyperion)
Opera – Rossini Matilde di Shabran Conducted by Riccardo Frizza (Decca)
Orchestral – Prokofiev Complete Symphonies London Symphony Orchestra / Valery Gergiev (Philips)
Recital – Simon Keenlyside: Tales of Opera Munich Radio Orchestra / Ulf Schirmer (Sony Classical)
Solo vocal – R. Strauss Lieder Jonas Kaufmann; Helmut Deutsch (Harmonia Mundi)

2006
Artist of the Year – Angela Hewitt
Lifetime Achievement – Sir Charles Mackerras
Label of the Year – Virgin Classics
Orchestral (Record of the Year) – Mahler – Symphony No. 6 Berlin Philharmonic Orchestra / Claudio Abbado
Classic FM Listeners' Choice – Alison Balsom
Editor's Choice – Stanford – Orchestral Songs Gerald Finley; BBC NOW/Richard Hickox. Chandos.
Chamber – Taneyev – Chamber Music Vadim Repin; Ilya Gringolts; Nobuko Imai; Lynn Harrell; Mikhail Pletnev DG
Concerto – Leif Ove Andsnes, Berlin PO, Pappano: Rachmaninov Piano Concertos Nos 1 & 2	(EMI)
Contemporary – Magnus Lindberg – Clarinet Concerto Kari Kriikku; Finnish RSO/Sakari Oramo
Historic archive – Wagner – Siegfried Bayreuth Festival/Keilberth
Early music – Tallis Gaude gloriosa The Cardinall's Musick / Andrew Carwood (Hyperion)
Instrumental – Szymanowski – Piano Works Piotr Anderszewski
Solo Vocal – Schubert – Abendbilder Christian Gerhaher; Gerold Huber

2005
Artist of the year – Michael Tilson Thomas
Lifetime Achievement – Marilyn Horne
Special Achievement – The Lindsays
Label of the year – Naxos
Classic FM Listener's Choice – Plácido Domingo
Editor's Choice – Rachmaninov Piano Concertos, Rhapsody on a Theme of Paganini, Stephen Hough, Dallas Symphony Orchestra / Andrew Litton (Hyperion)
Baroque Vocal (Record of the Year) – Bach Cantatas Vol. 1  Monteverdi Choir and Orchestra / John Eliot Gardiner (Soli Deo Gloria)
Early Music – John Browne, Music from the Eton Choir Book. The Tallis Scholars / Peter Phillips (Gimell)
Choral – Haydn The Seasons Soloists, RIAS Kammerchor, Freiburger Barockorchester / René Jacobs (Harmonia Mundi)
Orchestral – Haydn Paris symphonies Concentus Musicus Wien / Nikolaus Harnoncourt (Deutsche Harmonia Mundi)
Chamber – Beethoven, Late String Quartets, Takács Quartet (Decca)
Concerto – Zimerman, Andsnes, Grimaud, Boulez	Bartók Piano Concertos Nos 1–3 (DG)
Contemporary – Birtwistle Earth Dances Ensemble Modern (DG)
DVD – Berlioz, Les Troyens, Soloists, Monteverdi Choir, Orchestre Revolutionnaire et Romantique / John Eliot Gardiner (BBC)
Recital – Gounod and Massenet, Arias, Rolando Villazón, Orchestre Philharmonique de Radio France / Evelino Pidò (Virgin Classics)

2004
Artist of the year – Magdalena Kožená
Lifetime Achievement – London Symphony Orchestra
Special Achievement – Peter Alward
Label of the Year – Telarc
Opera (Record of the Year) – Mozart Le nozze di Figaro Soloists; Ghent Collegium Vocale; Concerto Köln / René Jacobs Harmonia Mundi HMC90 1818–1820
Classic FM Listeners' Choice – Bryn Terfel
Baroque Vocal – Antonio Vivaldi Vespri Solenni per la Festa dell'Assunzione di Maria Vergine Soloists, Concerto Italiano / Rinaldo Alessandrini (Naïve Opus 111)
Chamber –	Takács Quartet	Beethoven: String Quartets Op 18 (Decca)
Concerto – Edvard Grieg and Robert Schumann Piano Concertos Leif Ove Andsnes – Berlin Philharmonic Orchestra / Mariss Jansons (EMI)
Contemporary – Thomas Adès America, A Prophecy CBSO (EMI)
Early Music – Orlando Gibbons Consorts for viols, Phantasm (Avie)
Historic Reissue – Ernest Chausson, Claude Debussy, Henri Duparc, Maurice Ravel Mélodies Gérard Souzay (baritone), Jacqueline Bonneau (piano), Orchestre de la Société des Concerts du Conservatoire / Edouard Lindenberg (Testament)
Orchestral – Arnold Bax The Symphonies, BBC Philharmonic Orchestra / Vernon Handley (Chandos)

2003
Artist of the Year – Marin Alsop
Lifetime Achievement Award – Leontyne Price
Special Achievement Award – Vernon Handley
Label of the Year – Harmonia Mundi
Chamber Music (Record of the Year) – Schumann String Quartets Nos 1 & 3 – Zehetmair Quartet, ECM
Classic FM Listener's Choice – Cecilia Bartoli
Début Disc and Editor's Choice – Prokofiev; Scriabin; Stravinsky; Tchaikovsky Piano Works, Simon Trpceski
Baroque Vocal – Handel: Arcadian Duets. Emmanuelle Haïm, Le Concert d'Astrée. Virgin Classics.
Choral – Johann Nepomuk Hummel, Masses, Collegium Musicum 90, Richard Hickox (Chandos Records)
Orchestral – Sibelius: Rondo of the waves; Lahti SO, Osmo Vänskä (BIS)
Concerto – Antonio Vivaldi, Violin Concertos, Op 4, La Stravaganza, Arte dei Suonatori, Rachel Podger Channel Classics CCS19598)
Contemporary – Steve Reich: City Life. Ensemble Modern. RCA.
Early Music – The Call of the Phoenix: Rare 15th-century English Church Music. The Orlando Consort. Harmonia Mundi.
Instrumental – Chopin, Etudes, Opp 10 & 12, Murray Perahia (Sony Classical SK61885)
Opera – Benjamin Britten, The Turn of the Screw, Ian Bostridge, Mahler Chamber Orchestra, Daniel Harding (Virgin Classics)

2002
Artist of the Year – Maxim Vengerov
Lifetime Achievement – Mirella Freni
Concerto (Record of the Year) – Saint-Saëns, Complete Works for Piano and Orchestra, Stephen Hough/City of Birmingham Symphony Orchestra/Sakari Oramo (Hyperion)
Editor's Choice – R. Strauss, Four Last Songs, Soile Isokoski / Berlin Radio Symphony Orchestra / Marek Janowski (Ondine)
Baroque Instrumental – Biber, Violin Sonatas Nos 2, 3, 5 & 7. Nisi Dominus. Passacaglia, Sonnerie/ Monica Huggett / Thomas Guthrie (ASV Gaudeamus)
Baroque Vocal – Monteverdi, Selva morale e spirituale, Cantus Cölln / Concerto Palatino / Konrad Junghänel (Harmonia Mundi)
Chamber – Beethoven, Three String Quartets, Rasumovsky, Op 59. String Quartet in E-flat, 'Harp', Op 74, Takács Quartet (Decca)
Choral – Schoenberg, Gurre-Lieder, Karita Mattila / Anne Sofie von Otter / Thomas Moser / Philip Langridge / Thomas Quasthoff / Berlin Radio Chorus / MDR Radio Chorus, Leipzig / Ernst Senff Choir / Berlin Philharmonic Orchestra / Sir Simon Rattle (EMI)
Concerto – Saint-Saëns, Complete Works for Piano and Orchestra, Stephen Hough / City of Birmingham Symphony Orchestra / Sakari Oramo (Hyperion)
Contemporary – Birtwistle, Pulse Shadows, Claron McFadden / Arditti Quartet / Nash Ensemble / Reinbert de Leeuw (Teldec)
Debut Recording – Jonathan Lemalu sings songs by Brahms, Fauré, Finzi etc., Jonathan Lemalu / Roger Vignoles (EMI Debut)
DVD – John Adams, El Niño, Dawn Upshaw / Lorraine Hunt Lieberson / Willard White / Maîtrise de Paris Children's Choir / London Voices / Theatre of Voices / Deutsches Symphony Orchestra, Berlin / Kent Nagano / Peter Sellars (Stage director) / Peter Maniura (Video director) (ArtHaus Musik)
Early Music – Marenzio, Madrigals, Marenzio Madrigals Il Concerto Italiano / Rinaldo Alessandrini (Opus 111)
Historic Archive – Great conductors of the twentieth century: Ferenc Fricsay (EMI/IMG)
Historic Reissue – Fauré, 13 Nocturnes, Germaine Thyssens-Valentin (Testament)
Instrumental – Grieg, Lyric Pieces (excerpts), Leif Ove Andsnes (EMI)
Opera – Berlioz, Les Troyens, Ben Heppner / Michelle DeYoung / Petra Lang / Sara Mingardo / Peter Mattei / Stephen Milling / Kenneth Tarver / Toby Spence / Orlin Annastassov / Tigran Martirossian / Isabelle Cals / Alan Ewing / Guang Yang / Andrew Greenan / Roderick Earle / Bülent Bezd (LSO Live)
Orchestral – Bruckner, Symphony No. 8. Berlin Philharmonic Orchestra / Gunter Wand (RCA)
Recital – Gluck, Italian Arias, Cecilia Bartoli / Akadema für Alte Musik, Berlin / Bernhard Forck (Decca)
Vocal – Chaminade, Mots d'amour, Anne Sofie von Otter / Bengt Forsberg / Nils-Erik Sparf / Peter Jablonski (DG)

2001
Artist of the Year – Cecilia Bartoli
Lifetime Achievement – Victoria de los Ángeles
Retailer of the Year – Bath Compact Discs
Orchestral (Record of the Year) – Vaughan Williams, A London Symphony and Butterworth, The Banks of Green Willow, London Symphony Orchestra / Hickox (Chandos Records)
Classic FM People's Choice Award – Verdi, Verdi: Heroines, Angela Gheorghiu; Giuseppe Verdi Symphony Orchestra, Milan/Chailly (Decca)
Editor's Choice – Handel, Rinaldo, David Daniels Cecilia Bartoli/Academy of Ancient Music/Christopher Hogwood (Decca L'Oiseau-Lyre)
Baroque Instrumental – Bach, Partitas, BWV 825–30, Trevor Pinnock (Hannsler Classic)
Baroque Vocal – Bach, St. Matthew Passion, Christoph Prégardien tenor Evangelist; Matthias Goerne baritone Christus; Christine Schäfer, Dorothea Röschmann sopranos; Bernarda Fink, Elisabeth von Magnus contraltos; Michael Schade, Markus Schäfer tenors; Dietrich Henschel, Oliver Widmer basses; Vienna Boys' Choir; Arnold (Teldec)
Chamber – Vaughan Williams, String Quartets Nos 1 & 2. Phantasy Quintet, Maggini Quartet with Garfield Jackson (Naxos Records)
Choral – Britten, AMDG. "Choral Dances from Gloriana". "Chorale after an Old French Carol". "A Hymn to the Virgin". Sacred and Profane, Op. 91, Polyphony/Stephen Layton (Hyperion)
Concerto – Schoenberg, Piano Concerto, Mitsuko Uchida/Cleveland Orchestra/Pierre Boulez (Philips)
Contemporary – Boulez, Anthèmes 2. Messagesquisse. Sur incises, Ensemble Intercontemporain/Pierre Boulez (DG) 
Debut Recording – Debussy, Dutilleux, Ravel, String Quartets, Belcea Quartet (EMI)
DVD – Berlioz, La damnation de Faust, Vesselina Kasarova/Willard White/Staatskapelle Dresden/Sylvian Cambreling (ArtHaus Musik)
Early Music – Gesualdo, Il quarto libro di madrigali, La Venexiana/Claudio Cavina (Glossa)
Instrumental – Bach, Goldberg Variations, Murray Perahia (Sony Classical)
Opera – Massenet, Manon, Angela Gheorghiu/Roberto Alagna/Chorus and SO of La Monnaie/Antonio Pappano (EMI)
Recital – French Arias, Roberto Alagna/Orchestra of the Royal Opera House, Covent Garden/Betrand de Billy (EMI)
Vocal – Love Songs, Magdalena Kožená/Graham Johnson (DG)

2000
Artist of the Year – Antonio Pappano
Lifetime Achievement – Carlo Bergonzi
Special Achievement – Wagner, Götterdämmerung, soloists; Chorus and Orchestra of the Bayreuth Festival/Knapperstsbusch (Testament)
Retailer of the Year – HMV 150 Oxford Street & Bath Compact Discs
Orchestral (Record of the Year) – Mahler, Symphony No 10 in F-sharp, Berlin Philharmonic Orchestra/Sir Simon Rattle (EMI)
Classic FM People's Choice Award – Verdi, Verdi: Heroines, Angela Gheorghiu; Giuseppe Verdi Symphony Orchestra, Milan/Chailly (Decca)
Baroque Instrumental – Pandolfi, Violin Sonatas Op. 3, Nos 1–6; Op. 4, Nos 1–6, Andrew Manze, Richard Egarr (Harmonia Mundi)
Baroque Vocal – Handel, Acis and Galatea, Les Arts Florissants/William Christie (Erato)
Chamber – Shostakovich, Complete String Quartets (Nos 1–15), Emerson Quartet (Deutsche Grammophon)
Choral – L Boulanger, Faust et Hélène: Psaume 24. "D'un soir triste". "D'un matin de printemps". Psaume 130, "Du fond de l'abîme", Dawson, Murray, Bottone, Mackenzie, Howard; CBSO Chorus; BBC Philharmonic Orchestra/Tortelier (Chandos)
Concerto – Haydn, Piano Concertos Nos 3, 4 & 11, Norwegian Chamber Orchestra/Andsnes (EMI)
Contemporary – Elliott Carter, Symphonia: sum fluxae pretium spei. Clarinet Concerto, Elliott Carter (DG)
Early Music – William Byrd, Complete Keyboard Works, Davitt Moroney (Hyperion)
Instrumental – Leopold Godowsky, The Complete Studies on Chopin's Etudes, Marc-André Hamelin (Hyperion)
Opera – Karol Szymanowski, King Roger. Symphony No. 4 Symphonia concertante, Op. 60, soloists; CBS Youth Chorus; CBS Chorus; Andsnes; CBSO/Rattle (EMI)
Recital – Verdi, Verdi: Heroines, Angela Gheorghiu; Giuseppe Verdi Symphony Orchestra, Milan/Chailly (Decca)
Vocal – Barbara Bonney, Diamonds in the Snow: Songs by Alfvén, Grieg, Sibelius, Sjöberg and Stenhammar, Antonio Pappano (Decca)

Gramophone Awards of the 1990s

1999
Artist of the Year – Martha Argerich
Lifetime Achievement – Isaac Stern
Special Achievement – Philip's Great Pianists of the 20th Century
Opera (Record of the Year) – Antonín Dvořák, Rusalka, Mackerras (Decca)
Editor's Choice – Naxos's British music series
Baroque Instrumental – Jacquet de la Guerre, Premiére livre, Carole Cerasi (Metronome)
Baroque Vocal – A Scarlatti, Il primo omicidio, René Jacobs (Harmonia Mundi)
Chamber – Robert Schumann, Piano Trios, Florestan Trio (Hyperion)
Concerto – Frédéric Chopin, Piano Concertos, Martha Argerich/Dutoit (EMI)
20th-Century Concerto – Maurice Ravel, Piano Concertos, Krystian Zimerman; Pierre Boulez (Deutsche Grammophon)
Early Music – Guillaume Dufay, Missa Jacobi, Binchois Consort/Kirkman (Hyperion)
Contemporary – Toru Takemitsu, Quotation of Dream, Knussen (DG)
Instrumental – Arcadi Volodos, Arcadi Volodos Live at Carnegie Hall (Sony Classical)
Orchestral – Anton Bruckner, Symphony No. 4, Wand (RCA)
Recital – Renée Fleming, I Want Magic!, Renée Fleming; Levine (Decca)
Solo Vocal – Ludwig van Beethoven, Lieder, Stephen Genz; Vignoles (Hyperion)
20th-Century Chamber – Elliott Carter, String Quartets, Arditti Quartett (Auvidis)
20th-Century Instrumental – Luciano Berio, Sequenzas, various artists (DG)
20th-Century Opera – Carl Nielsen, Maskarade, Schirmer (Decca)
20th-Century Orchestral – Edgar Varèse, Complete Orchestral Works, Riccardo Chailly (Decca)
20th-Century Vocal – Hanns Eisler, Hollywood Songbook, Goerne; Schneider (Decca)

1998

Artist of the Year – Riccardo Chailly
Lifetime Achievement – Menahem Pressler
Choral (Record of the Year) – Martin, Pizzetti, Die Schöpfung, Westminster Cathedral Choir/James O'Donnell (Hyperion)
Best-selling disc – James Horner, Titanic–Original Soundtrack (Sony Classical)
Editor's Choice – Thomas Adès, Adès: Arcadiana Op. 12. The origin of the harp, soloists; Endellion Quartet; London Sinfonietta; King's college choir, Cambridge/Adès, Stenz, Cleobury (EMI Debut)
Baroque Non-Vocal – Les Talens Lyriques/Christophe Rousset, Rameau—Overtures (L'Oiseau-Lyre)
Baroque Vocal – Monteverdi, Concerto Italiano, Rinaldo Alessandrini
Chamber – Bartók, String quartets, Takacs Quartet (Decca)
Concerto – Joshua Bell, Barber, Bloch, Walton, Baltimore Symphony Orchestra/David Zinman (Decca)
Contemporary – Birtwistle The Mask of Orpheus, Andrew Davis, Martyn Brabbins, Birtwistle, soloists; BBC Singers; BBC Symphony Orchestra/Andrew Davis, Martyn Brabbins (NMC)
Early Music – Canciones and Ensaladas, Ensemble Clément Janequin/Dominique Visse (Harmonia Mundi)
Early Opera – Rameau, Les fêtes d'Hébé, Soloists; Les Arts Florissants Chorus and Orchestra/William Christie (Erato)
Film Music – Kenneth Alwyn, The Ladykillers, Royal Ballet Sinfonia/Kenneth Alwyn (Silva Screen)
Instrumental – Stephen Hough, Mompou (Hyperion)
Music Theatre – Kander & Ebb, Chicago, Broadway Cast/Rob Fisher (RCA Victor)
Opera – Rossini, Il Turco in Italia, soloists; Milan La Scala Chorus and Orchestra/Riccardo Chailly (Decca)
Orchestral – Bartók, The Miraculous Mandarin, Hungarian Radio Chorus; Budapest Festival Orchestra/Ivan Fischer (Philips)
Solo Vocal – Schumann, Ian Bostridge, Julius Drake (EMI)

1997

Artist of the Year – Yo-Yo Ma
Lifetime achievement – Mstislav Rostropovich
Young Artist of the Year – Béla Bartók: Sonata for Violin and Piano No. 1. Solo Vi, Isabelle Faust; Ewa Kupiec, Harmonia Mundi
Record of the year & Opera – Giacomo Puccini: La rondine, London Voices; London SO / Pappano, EMI
Best-selling disc – Agnus Dei, New College Choir, Oxford / Higginbottom, Erato
Editor's Choice – Monica Huggett, Johann Sebastian Bach: Sonatas and Partitas for solo violin, EMI/Virgin Veritas
Britannia Music Members' award – Something Wonderful: Bryn Terfel sings Rodgers, Terfel; Chorus of Opera North; English Northern Philharmonia / Daniel, Deutsche Grammophon
Baroque non-vocal – Henry Purcell: Fantazias, Joanna Levine; Susanna Pell; Phantasm, Simax
Baroque vocal – Antonio Caldara: Maddalena ai piedi di Cristo, Schola Cantorum Basiliensis / Rene Jacobs, Harmonia Mundi
Chamber – Maurice Ravel: Violin Sonatas etc., Juillet; Mørk; Rogé, Decca
Choral – Joseph Haydn: Die Schöpfung, Monteverdi Choir; English Baroque Soloists / Gardiner, Archiv Produktion
Concerto – Karol Szymanowski: Violin Concertos etc., Zehetmair; Avenhaus; CBSO / Rattle, EMI
Contemporary – György Ligeti: Etudes, Pierre-Laurent Aimard, Sony Classical
Early music – Johannes Ockeghem: Requiem etc., The Clerks' Group / Edward Wickham, ASV
Early opera – Jean-Philippe Rameau: Hippolyte et Aricie, Les Arts Florissants / Christie, Erato
Engineering – Dyson: The Canterbury Pilgrims, London Symphony Chorus and Orchestra / Hickox, Chandos
Film music – Bernard Herrmann: Vertigo, Royal Scottish National Orchestra / McNeely, Varèse Sarabande
Instrumental – George Frideric Handel, Domenico Scarlatti: Keyboard Suites and Sonatas, Murray Perahia, Sony Classical
Music theatre – Lerner & Loewe: My Fair Lady, National Symphony Orchestra / J. Owen Edwards, TER
Orchestral – Jean Sibelius: Symphonies Nos. 1 and 4, London SO / Davis, RCA
Solo vocal – Robert Schumann: Complete Lieder Vol. 1, Christine Schafer; Graham Johnson, Hyperion
Video – Alban Berg: Lulu, Soloists; London PO / Davis, NVC Arts

1996

Artist of the Year – Anne Sofie von Otter
Lifetime achievement – Yehudi Menuhin
Young Artist of the Year – David Pyatt
Record of the year & Concerto – Emil von Sauer, Xaver Scharwenka: Piano Concertos; Hough; City of Birmingham Symphony Orchestra / Lawerence Foster, Hyperion Records
Best-selling disc – Lesley Garrett – Soprano in Red; Lesley Garrett (sop); Crouch End Festival Chorus; Royal Philharmonic Concert Orchestra, Holmes Silva Classics
Baroque non-vocal – Vivaldi: Il Proteo – Double, Triple Concertos; Coin (cello); Il Giardino Armonico / Antonini, Teldec
Baroque vocal – Vivaldi: Stabat mater. Cessate, omai ces; Scholl (alto); Ensemble 415 / Banchini, Harmonia Mundi
Chamber – Haydn: String Quartets Op. 33 Nos 2, 3 and 5; Quatuor Mosaiques; Auvidis Astree
Choral – Grainger: Songs and Dancing Ballads; Monteverdi Choir; English Country Gardiner Orchestra / Gardiner, Philips
Concerto – Sauer, Scharwenka: Piano Concertos; Hough; City of Birmingham Symphony Orchestra / Lawerence Foster, Hyperion Records
Contemporary – Harrison Birtwistle: Gawain; Royal Opera House, Covent Garden / Howarth, Collins Classics
Early music – Dunstable: Sacred Choral Works; Orlando Consort, Metronome
Early opera – Handel: Ariodante; Wilhelmshaven Vocal Ensemble; Freiburg Baroque Orchestra / McGegan, Harmonia Mundi
Engineering – Sibelius: Symphony No 5. En saga; Lahti SO / Vänskä, BIS
Historic non-vocal – Debussy: Complete Piano Works; Walter Gieseking (piano), EMI
Historic vocal – Lucrezia Bori: Opera and Operetta Arias; Bori (sop) with various artists (restored by Ward Marston), Romophone
Instrumental – Domenico Scarlatti: Keyboard Sonatas; Mikhail Pletnev (piano), Virgin Classics
Music theatre – Gershwin: Oh Kay! Orchestra of St Luke's / Stern, Nonesuch
Opera – Prokofiev: The Fiery Angel; Kirov Opera / Gergiev, Philips
Orchestral – Schmidt: Symphony No 4. Variations on a Hussar; London PO / Franz Welser-Möst EMI
Solo vocal – Schubert: Lieder, Volume 25. Die schöne Mullerin; Bostridge (tenor); Fischer-Dieskau (narrator); Johnson (piano), Hyperion
Video – Yehudi Menuhin – The Violin of the Century, EMI

1995

Artist of the Year – Pierre Boulez
Lifetime achievement – Sir Michael Tippett
Special achievement – Entartete Musik – Korngold: Das Wunder des Heliane; Berlin Radio Chorus; Deutsches SO / Mauceri, Decca
Record of the year & Concerto – Prokofiev: Violin Concerto No 1. Shostakovich: Vio; Maxim Vengerov; London Symphony Orchestra / Rostropovich, Teldec
Best-selling disc – The Three Tenors in Concert, 1994; José Carreras, Plácido Domingo, Luciano Pavarotti; Los Angeles Music Center Opera Chorus; Los Angeles Philharmonic Orchestra / Zubin Mehta, Teldec
Baroque non-vocal – Heinrich Ignaz Franz Biber: Violin Sonatas; Romanesca, Harmonia Mundi
Baroque vocal – Jean-Philippe Rameau: Grand Motets; Les Arts Florissants / William Christie, Erato
Chamber – Gabriel Fauré: Piano Quintets; Domus, Hyperion
Choral & engineering – Karol Szymanowski: Stabat mater. Symphony No. 3. City of Birmingham Symphony Orchestra and Chorus / Rattle, EMI
Concerto – Sergei Prokofiev: Violin Concerto No 1. Dmitri Shostakovich: Vio; Maxim Vengerov; London Symphony Orchestra / Rostropovich, Teldec
Contemporary – György Ligeti: Concertos – Piano; Violin; Cello; Gawriloff; Queyras; Aimard; Ensemble InterContemporain / Boulez DG
Early music – Robert Fayrfax: Missa O quam glorifica, etc. The Cardinall's Musick / Carwood, ASV Gaudeamus
Early opera – Henry Purcell: King Arthur; Soloists; Les Arts Florissants / Christie, Erato
Engineering – Karol Szymanowski: Stabat mater. Symphony No. 3. City of Birmingham Symphony Orchestra and Chorus / Rattle, EMI
Historic non-vocal – Ludwig van Beethoven: Symphony No. 9; Soloists; Lucerne Festival Chorus; Philharmonia / Furtwängler, Tahra mono
Historic vocal – Maurice Ravel: L'enfant et les sortileges; French Radio National Chorus and Orchestra / Bour, Testament
Instrumental – Frédéric Chopin: Four Ballades. Mazurkas. Etudes. Nocturne; Murray Perahia (piano), Sony Classical
Music theatre – I wish it so – The Songs of Vernon Duke; Dawn Upshaw (soprano); orchestra / Eric Stern (piano), Elektra Nonesuch
Opera – William Walton: Troilus and Cressida; Chorus & Orchestra of Opera North / Hickox, Chandos
Orchestral – Arnold Schoenberg: Chamber Symphony No 1. Erwartung; Phyllis Bryn-Julson (sop); Birmingham Contemporary Music Group; City of Birmingham Symphony Orchestra / Rattle, EMI
Solo vocal – Franz Schubert: Lieder; Bryn Terfel (baritone); Malcolm Martineau (piano), DG
Video – The Art of Conducting – Great Conductors of the Past, Teldec

1994
Instrumental & Record of the Year – Debussy: Preludes; Krystian Zimerman (piano), DG
Chamber – Tchaikovsky: String Quartets No. 1 – No.3 / Souvenir de Florence; Yuri Yurov (viola), Mikhail Milman (cello), Borodin Quartet; Teldec
Opera – Britten: Gloriana; Josephine Barstow, Phillip Langridge, Welsh National Opera / Charles Mackerras, Argo
Historic Vocal – Britten: Peter Grimes / The Rape of Lucretia / Folksong Arrangements; Peter Pears (t), Joan Cross (s), BBC Theatre Chorus, Orchestra of The Royal Opera House / Nancy Evans (ca), Pears, Cross, English Opera Group Chamber Orchestra / Sophie Whyss (s), Pears, Britten (piano); EMI
Historic Non-Vocal – Schoenberg: Verklaerte Nacht / Schubert: String Quintet in C major; Alvin Dinkin(va), Kurt Reher (cello), Hollywood String Quartet; Testament
Engineering – Dutilleux: Symphonies Nos. 1 & 2; BBC Philharmonic / Yan Pascal Tortelier, Chandos
Orchestral – Koechlin: The Jungle Book, Symphonic Poems; Berlin Radio Symphony Orchestra / David Zinman, RCA
Choral – Delius: Sea Drift, Songs of Farewell, Songs of Sunset; Bryn Terfel (bass), Sally Burgess (mezzo), Bournemouth Symphony Orchestra & Chorus / Hickox, Chandos
Concerto – Bartók: Violin Concerto No. 2, Rhapsodies Nos. 1 & 2; Kyung-wha Chung, City of Birmingham Symphony Orchestra / Rattle, EMI
Contemporary – Robin Holloway: Second Concerto for Orchestra; BBC Symphony Orchestra / Oliver Knussen, NMC
Solo Vocal – Samuel Barber: Complete Songs; Cheryl Studer, Thomas Hampson, John Browning, DG
Music Theatre – Bernstein: On The Town; LSO / Michael Tilson Thomas, DG
Baroque Vocal – Fourth Book of the Montev; Concerto Italiano, Opus 111
Baroque Non-vocal – Bach: Goldberg Variations; Pierre Hantai, Opus 111
Young Artist of the Year – Maxim Vengerov
Lifetime Achievement – Klaus Tennstedt
Special Achievement – Richter: The Authorized Edition; Sviatoslav Richter (piano), Phillips
Best Selling Record – Canto Gregoriano; Coro de monjes del Monasterio Benedictino de Santo Domingo de Silos / Ismael Fernández de la Cuesta, EMI
Early Music – Cipriano de Rore: Missa Praeter rerum seriem; The Tallis Scholars / Peter Phillips, Gimell
Video – Bernstein: On The Town; LSO/ Michael Tilson Thomas, Barbican Centre, June 1992, DG
Artist of the Year – John Eliot Gardiner

1993
Solo Vocal (Record of the Year) – Grieg Songs Anne Sofie von Otter (mez); Bengt Forsberg (piano)
Baroque Non-Vocal – Heinichen Dresden Concertos. Musica Antiqua Koeln / Reinhard Goebel
Baroque Vocal – San Giovanni Battista Stradella. Catherine Bott, Christine Batty (sopranos); Gérard Lesne (alto); Richard Edgar-Wilson (tenor); Philippe Huttenlocher (baritone); Les Musiciens du Louvre / Marc Minkowski
Chamber – Quatuor Mosaiques Haydn String Quartet Op. 20
Choral – Felix Mendelssohn. Elias. Miles, Donath, van Nes, George, MDR-Chor Leipzig, Israel Philharmonic Orchestra, Masur
Concerto – Brahms Piano Concerto No.1 in D Minor Op. 15 Stephen Kovacevich (piano); London Philharmonic Orchestra / Wolfgang Sawallisch (coupled with Zwei Gesänge, Op. 91 with Ann Murray, Nobuko Imai)
Contemporary – James MacMillan. The Confession of Isobel Gowdie / Tryst (Koch). BBC Scottish Symphony Orchestra. Maksymiuk.
Early Music – Venetian Vespers. Gabrieli Consort and Players / Paul McCreesh
Engineering – Debussy, Le martyre de Saint Sébastien. Sylvia McNair (sop); Nathalie Stutzmann (contr); Ann Murray (mez); Leslie Caron (narr); London Symphony Chorus and Orchestra / Michael Tilson Thomas
Historical Non-Vocal – Rachmaninov. The Complete Recordings Sergei Rachmaninov RCA Victor Gold Seal
Historical Vocal – Singers of Imperial Russia. Vols.1–4.
Instrumental – 80th Birthday Recital. Shura Cherkassky.
Music Theatre – George Gershwin. Lady, Be Good! Eric Stern, Lara Teeter, Ann Morrison.
Opera – Poulenc. Dialogues des Carmélites / Dubosc, Gorr, Yakar, Dupuy, Fournier, van Dam, Viala, Opéra National de Lyon, Nagano
Orchestral – Hindemith. Kammermusik. Royal Concertgebouw Orchestra. Chailly.
Video – Wagner. Der Ring des Nibelungen. 1989 Bavarian State Opera. Sawallisch.
Special Achievement – Edward Greenfield.
Best-selling Record – Henryk Gorecki: Symphony 3 "Sorrowful Songs". Zinman. London Sinfonietta. Upshaw.
Young Artist of the Year – Sarah Chang.
Artist of the Year – Simon Rattle.
Lifetime Achievement – Dietrich Fischer-Dieskau.

1992
Orchestral (Record of the Year) – Beethoven 9 Symphonies. Nikolaus Harnoncourt. The Chamber Orchestre of Europe.
Baroque Vocal – Handel. Giulio Cesare. Larmore, Schlick, Fink, Rorholm, Ragin. Rene Jacobs. Concerto Koeln.
Baroque Non-Vocal – Rameau. Harpsichord Works. Christophe Rousset.
Chamber – Symanowski String Quartets No 1 in C Major, Op.37; No. 2 Op. 56 / Webern Langsamer Satz. Carmina Quartet
Choral – Britten. War Requiem, Op. 66; Sinfonia da Requiem, Op. 20; Ballad of Heroes, Op. 14. Harper, Langridge, Hill, Shirley-Quirk. St Paul's Cathedral Choristers, London Symphony Orchestra and Chorus. Richard Hickox.
Concerto – Medtner. Piano Conccertos No.2 in C Minor, Op. 50; No 3. in E Minor, Op. 60. Nickolai Demidenko. BBC Scottish Symphony Orchestra. Jerzy Maksymiuk.
Contemporary – John Tavener. The Protecting Veil; Thrinos / Britten. Solo Cello Suite No. 3, Op. 87. Steven Isserlis. London Symphony Orchestra. Rozhdestvensky.
Early Music – The Rose and The Ostrich Feather. Music from the Eton Choirbook. Volume I. The Sixteen. Harry Christophers.
Engineering – Britten. War Requiem, Op. 66; Sinfonia da Requiem, Op. 20; Ballad of Heroes, Op. 14. Harper, Langridge, Hill, Shirley-Quirk. St Paul's Cathedral Choristers, London Symphony Orchestra and Chorus. Richard Hickox.
Historical Vocal – Covent Garden on Record: A History.
Historical Non-Vocal – The Elgar Edition. Volume 1. London Symphony Orchestra. Royal Albert Hall Orchestra. Elgar.
Instrumental – Alkan. 25 Preludes dans les tons majeurs et mineur, Op. 31 / Shostakovich. 24 Preludes, Op. 34. Olli Mustonen.
Music Theatre – Bernstein. Candide. Hadley, Anderson. London Symphony Orchestra & Chorus. Bernstein (cond).
Opera – Strauss. Die Frau ohne Schatten. Behrens, Domingo, Runkel, van Dam, Varady, Jo. Wiener Philharmoniker. George Solti.
Solo Vocal – Schubert. Lieder. Brigitte Fassbaender, Aribert Reimann.
Special Achievement – Abbey Road Studios.
Best-selling Record – Essential Opera.
Young Artist of the Year – Bryn Terfel.
Artist of the Year – Dame Kiri Janette Te Kanawa.
Lifetime Achievement – Sir George Solti.

1991
Record of the Year & Choral – Beethoven. Missa Solemnis. Gardiner. English Baroque Soloists. Margiono, Robbin, Kendall, Miles, Monteverdi Choir.
Baroque Vocal – Handel. Susanna. Hunt, Minter, Feldman, Parker, Jeffery Thomas, David Thomas. Nicholas McGegan. Philharmonia Baroque Orchestra. U.C. Berkeley Chamber Chorus.
Baroque Non-Vocal – Biber. Mystery Sonatas. Holloway (vn), Davitt Moroney(org/hpd), Tragicomedia.
Chamber – Brahms: Piano Quartets. Opp. 25, 26 & 60. Ax, Stern, Laredo, Ma.
Concerto – Sibelius. Violin Concerto in D Major, op. 47. Kavakos(vn). Lahti Symphony Orchestra, Vanska.
Contemporary – John Casken. Golem. Clarke, Hall, Rozario, Robson, Wilson, Morris, Harrhy, Thomas. Music Project London. Richard Bernas.
Early Music – Palestrina. Missa Assumpta est Maria/ Missa Sicut Iilium. Tallis Scholars. Peter Phillips.
Engineering – Wordsworth. Symphony Nos. 2 & 3. London Philharmonic Orchestra. Braithwaite.
Historical Non-Vocal – Berg. Violin Concerto/Lyric Suite. Louis Krasner(vn), Galimir Quartet, BBC Symphony Orchestra, Webern.
Historical Vocal – Faure/Chausson/Airs Français. Gerard Souzay. Jacqueline Bonneau (piano).
Instrumental – Shostakovich. 24 Preludes and Fugues, op. 87. Tatyana Nikolaieva (piano).
Music Theatre – Sondheim. Into The Woods. Original London Cast.
Opera – Mozart. Idomeneo. Johnson, von Otter, Martinpelto, McNair, Robson, Winslade. John Eliot Gardiner. English Baroque Soloists.
Orchestral – Nielsen. Symphony No. 2 Op. 16 "The Four Temperaments" / Symphony No. 3 Op. 27 "Espansiva." Fromm, McMillan. San Francisco Symphony Orchestra. Herbert Blomstedt.
Solo Vocal – Schubert. Die Schoene Mullerin. Schreier, Schiff.
Special Achievement – Complete Mozart Edition
Artist of the Year – Luciano Pavarotti
Lifetime Achievement – Joan Sutherland

1990

Chamber – Respighi, Violin Sonata in B Minor, Kyung-Wha Chung and Krystian Zimerman; Deutsche Grammophon
Choral – Schumann: Das Paradies und die Peri; Edith Wiens, S. Herman, A. Gjevang; L'Orchestre de la Suisse Romande, Armin Jordan (conductor)
Concerto – Shostakovich: Violin Concerto No. 1 in A minor, Op. 99, Violin Concerto No. 2 in C-sharp minor, Op. 129; Lydia Mordkovitch (violin); SNO, Neemi Järvi (conductor); Chandos
Contemporary – George Benjamin: Antara, Boulez: Dérive, Memoriale; Harvey: Song Offerings; Walmsley-Clark (soprano), Bell (flute); London Sinfonietta, George Benjamin (conductor); Nimbus
Early Music – Gabrieli: A Venetian Coronation 1595, The Gabrieli Consort and Players, Paul McCreesh (conductor); Virgin Classics
Engineering – Britten: The Prince of the Pagodas; London Sinfonietta, Oliver Knussen (conductor); Virgin Classics
Historic (vocal) – Massenet: Werther; Ninon Vallin (mezzo), Georges Thill (tenor), Roque (baritone), Féraldy (soprano), Narcon (bass); Chorus and Orchestra of the Opéra-Comique, Elie Cohen (conductor); EMI
Historic (nonvocal) – Delius: Paris, Eventyr, Irmelin Prelude, Over the Hills and Far Away; LPO, Sir Thomas Beecham; EMI
Instrumental – Debussy: Piano Works; Zoltán Kocsis; Philips
Music Theatre – Cole Porter, Anything Goes; John McGlinn; EMI
Opera (Record of the Year) – Prokofiev: L'Amour des trois oranges; Choeurs et Orchestre de l'Opéra de Lyon, Kent Nagano; Virgin Classics
Orchestral – Vaughan Williams: A Sea Symphony; Lott (soprano), Summers (baritone); LPO, Bernard Haitink (conductor); EMI
Solo Vocal – Schubert: Schwanengesang, Heine and Seidl Lieder; Peter Schreier (tenor), András Schiff (piano); Decca
Special Achievement – Bach: Complete Sacred Cantatas Vol. 1–45; Vienna Concentus Musicus, Nikolaus Harnoncourt (conductor); Leonhardt Consort, Gustav Leonhardt (conductor); Teldec

Gramophone Awards of the 1980s

1989

Chamber (Record of the Year) – Bartók: String Quartets Nos. 1–6; Emerson Quartet; DG
Choral – Handel: Jephtha; Dawson, Holton (sopranos), Sofie von Otter (mezzo), Chance (countertenor), Robson (tenor), Varcoe (narrator), Ross (harpsichord), Nicholson (organ); Monteverdi Choir, English Baroque Soloists, John Eliot Gardiner (conductor); Philips
Concerto – Sibelius: Violin Concerto in D minor, Op. 47 / Nielsen: Violin Concerto, Op. 33; Cho-Liang Lin (violin); Philharmonia Orchestra of London / Swedish Radido Symphony, Esa-Pekka Salonen (conductor); CBS
Contemporary – Robert Simpson: Ninth Symphony; Bournemouth Symphony Orchestra, Handley; Hyperion
Early Music (Baroque) – Corelli: Concerto Grossi, Op. 6; The English Concert, Pinnock (conductor); Arkiv
Early Music (Medieval and Renaissance) – "A Song for Francesca"; Gothic Voices; Hyperion
Engineering and Production – Tubin: Symphonies 3, 8; Stockholm Radio Symphony Orchestra, Neeme Järvi; BIS
Historic (Non-Vocal) – Mahler: Symphony, No. 9; Vienna Philharmonic, Bruno Walter (conductor); EMI
Historic (Vocal) – Record of Singing, Volume 4; EMI
Instrumental – Mozart: Piano Sonatas 1–18; Mitsuko Uchida, Philips
Musical Theatre – Jerome Kern: Show Boat; John McGlinn; EMI
Operatic – Gershwin: Porgy and Bess; Glyndebourn, Rattle; EMI
Orchestral – Schubert: Symphonies; Chamber Orchestra of Europe, Abbado (conductor); DG
Remastered CD – Ravel: L'enfant et les sortilèges; French Radio National Orchestra, Lorin Maazel (conductor); DG
Solo Vocal – Schubert: Lieder, Volume 1; Janet Baker (mezzo), Graham Johnson (piano); Hyperion

1988

Chamber – Menndelssohn: Violin Sonatas in F minor and F major; Shlomo Mintz (violin), Paul Ostrovsky(piano); DG
Choral – Verdi: Requiem; Atlanta Symphony Orchestra and Chorus; Robert Shaw; Telarc
Concerto – Tchaikovsky: Piano Concerto No. 2; Peter Donohoe (piano); Bournemouth Symphony Orchestra, Rudolf Barshai; EMI
Contemporary – Sir Harrison Birtwistle: Carmen Arcadiae Mechanicae Perpetuum, Silbury Air, Secret Theatre; London Sinfonietta, Elgar Howarth; Etcetera
Early Music (Baroque) – Leclair: Scylla et Glaucus; Donna Brown, Rachel Yakar, Howard Cookk; Monteverdi Choir, English Baroque Soloists; John Eliot Gardiner; Erato
Early Music (Medieval and Renaissance) – "The Service of Venus and Mars: Music for the Knights of the Garter"; Gothic Voices, Christopher Page; Hyperion
Engineering and Production – Mahler: Symphony No. 2, "Resurrection"; Arleen Augér, Janet Baker; City of Birmingham Symphony Chorus & Orchestra; Simon Rattle
Historic (Non-Vocal) – Brahms: Violin Concerto in D minor, Op. 47 / Sibelius: Concerto for Violin and Orchestra in D, Op. 77; Ginette Neveu (violin); Philharmonia Orchestra, Issay Dobrowen, Walter Süsskind; EMI
Historic (Vocal) – Feodor Chaliapin: 1873–1938; Chaliapin(bass) et al.; EMI
Instrumental – Poulenc: Piano Works; Pascal Roge; Decca Musical Theatre
Operatic – Benjamin Britten: Paul Bunyan; The Plymouth Music Series Chorus and Orchestra; Philip Brunelle; Virgin Classics
Orchestral (Record of the Year) – Mahler: Symphony No. 2, "Resurrection"; Arleen Augér, Janet Baker; City of Birmingham Symphony Chorus & Orchestra; Simon Rattle
Period Performance – Haydn: Mass in D minor, "Nelson" / Te Deum in C major; Felicity Lott, Carolyn Watkinson, Maldwyn Davies, David Wilson-Johnson; The English Concert and Choir; Trevor Pinnock; Archiv;
Remastered CD – Strauss: Der Rosenkavalier; Elisabeth Schwarzkopf, Christa Ludwig, Teresa Stich Randall, Otto Edelmann, Eberhard Wächter; London Philharmonia Orchestra and Chorus, Herbert von Karajan; EMI
Solo Vocal – Schubert: Die Schöne Müllerin; Olaf Bär (baritone), Geoffrey Parsons (piano); EMI

1987

Chamber – Chausson: Concert in D major for Piano, violin, and string quartet, String quartet in C minor. Jean-Phillipe Collard (piano), Augistine Dumay (violin), Muir Quartet. EMI
Choral – Handel: Athalia. Joan Sutherland, Emma Kirkby, James Bowman, Aled Jones, Anthony Johnson, David Thomas. The Academy of Ancient Music / Christopher Hogwood. Decca
Concerto – Hummel: Piano Concerto No. 2 in A minor, Op 85; No. 3 in B minor, Op 89. Stephen Hough. English Chamber Orchestra / Bryden Thomson. Chandos
Contemporary – Sir Michael Tippett: The Mask of Time. Faye Robinson, Sarah Walker, Robert Tear, John Cheek. BBC Symphony Orchestra and Chorus / Andrew Davis. EMI
Early Music (Record of the Year) – Josquin Desprez: Missa Pange lingua, Missa La sol fa re mi. The Tallis Scholars / Peter Phillips. Gimell
Engineering and Production – Holst: The Planets. Montréal Symphony Orchestra / Charles Dutoit. Decca.
Historic (Non-Vocal) – Schubert: String Quartets, Piano Trio, Fantasia. Busch Quartet, Rudolf Serkin (piano). EMI.
Historic (Vocal) – The Art of Tito Schipa. Tito Schipa (tenor). EMI.
Instrumental – Haydn: Piano Sonatas. Alfred Brendel (piano). Philips.
Operatic – Verdi: La forza del destino. Rosalind Plowright, Agnes Baltsa, José Carreras, Bruson, Burchuladze, Pons, Tomlinson, Ambrosian Opera Chorus. Philharmonia Orchestra / Giuseppe Sinopoli. DG.
Orchestral – Mahler: Symphony No. 8. Elizabeth Connell, Edith Wiens, Felicity Lott, Trudeliese Schmidt, Nadine Denize, Richard Versalle, Jorma Hynnimen, Hans Sotin, Tiffin School Boys' Choir. London Philharmonic Orchestra & Choir / Klaus Tennstedt. EMI.
Period Performance – Beethoven: Symphonies 2 & 8. London Classical Players / Sir Roger Norrington. EMI.
Remastered CD – Beecham Conducts Delius: The Complete Stereo Recordings. Royal Philharmonic Orchestra / Sir Thomas Beecham. EMI.
Solo Vocal – Liszt, R. Strauss: Lieder. Brigitte Fassbaender, Irwin Gage. DG.

1986

Operatic (Record of the Year) – Rossini: Il viaggio a Reims. Katia Ricciarelli, Lucia Valentini Terrani, Lella Cuberli, Cecilia Gasdia, Francisco Araiza, Eduardo Gimenez, Leo Nucci, Ruggero Raimondi, Samuel Ramey, Enzo Dara. Prague Philharmonic Chorus, Chamber Orchestra of Europe / Claudio Abbado. DG.
Chamber – Fauré: Piano Quartets No. 1 in C minor, Op 15; No. 2 in G minor, Op 45. Domus. Hyperion.
Choral – Janáček: Glagolitic Mass. Elisabeth Söderström, Drahomíra Drobková, František Livora, Richard Novák. Czech Philharmonic / Sir Charles Mackerras. Supraphon
Concerto – Beethoven: Piano Concertos Nos. 3 & 4. Murray Perahia. Concertgebouw Orchestra / Bernard Haitink. CBS.
Contemporary – Lutosławski. Symphony No. 3. Los Angeles Philharmonic / Esa-Pekka Salonen. CBS.
Early Music (Baroque) – Bach: Die Kunst der Fuge, BWV 1080. Davitt Moroney (harpsichord). Harmonia Mundi.
Early Music (Medieval and Renaissance) – Chansons de toile au temps du Roman de la Rose. Esther Lamandier. Alienor.
Historic (Non-Vocal) – Beethoven: Late String Quartets. HMV.
Historic (Vocal) – The Record of Singing: Vol. 3. HMV.
Instrumental – Schubert: Fantasie in F minor for piano duet, D940 / Mozart: Sonata for 2 pianos in D major, K. 448. Murray Perahia, Radu Lupu. CBS
Orchestral – Vaughan Williams: Sinfonia Antarctica. Sheila Armstrong. London Philharmonic Orchestra & Choir / Bernard Haitink. EMI.
Solo Vocal – Schubert: Winterreise. Peter Schreier, Sviatoslav Richter. Philips.
Remastered CD – Britten: Peter Grimes. Peter Pears, Claire Watson, James Pease. Royal Opera House Chorus & Orchestra / Benjamin Britten. London.
Engineering and Production – Respighi: Belkis, Queen of Sheba; Metamorphoseon. Philharmonia Orchestra / Geoffrey Simon. Chandos.

1985
Concerto (Record of the Year) – Elgar: Violin Concerto in B minor, Op. 61. Nigel Kennedy. London Philharmonic Orchestra / Vernon Handley. EMI.
Chamber – Beethoven: Late String Quartets, Opp. 127, 130, 131, 132, 133 & 135. Alban Berg Quartett. HMV.
Choral – Fauré: Requiem, Cantique de Jean Racine, Op. 11. Caroline Ashton, Stephen Varcoe, Simon Standage, John Scott. Cambridge Singers, City of London Sinfonia / John Rutter. Conifer.
Contemporary – György Kurtág: : 21 poèmes de Rimma, Dalos, Op. 17 / Birtwistle: ...Agm... , Márta Fábián. John Alldis Choir. Ensemble InterContemporain / Pierre Boulez. Erato.
Early Music (Baroque) – Charpentier: Médée. Jill Feldman, Jacques Bona, Sophie Boulin, Phillipe Cantor, Agnès Mellon, Gilles Ragon. Les Arts Florissants / William Christie. Harmonia Mundi.
Early Music (Medieval and Renaissance) – Tomás Luis de Victoria: O quam gloriosum, Ave maris stella. Westminster Cathedral Choir / David Hill. Hyperion.
Historic (Non-Vocal) – Carl Nielsen: Symphonies. Erik Tuxen, Launy Grøndahl, Thomas Jensen / Danish Radio Symphony Orchestra. Danacord.
Historic (Vocal) – Claudia Muzio: The Columbia Recordings 1934–5. Italian Opera Arias, Italian, French and German Songs. HMV.
Instrumental – Liszt: Années de pèlerinage: Première Année: Suisse. Jorge Bolet. Decca.
Operatic – Mozart: Don Giovanni. Thomas Allen, Carol Vaness, Maria Ewing, Elizabeth Gale, Keith Lewis, Richard Van Allan. Glyndebourne Chorus. London Philharmonic Orchestra / Bernard Haitink. HMV.
Orchestral – Prokofiev: Symphony No. 6 in E-flat minor, Op. 111, Three Waltzes, Op. 110. Scottish National Orchestra / Neeme Järvi. Chandos.
Solo Vocal – Sibelius: Complete Songs. Tom Krause, Irwin Gage, Elisabeth Söderström, Vladimir Ashkenazy. Decca.
Engineering and Production – Ravel: Ma mère l'Oye, Pavane pour une infante défunte, Le tombeau de Couperin, Valses nobles et sentimentales. Montreal Symphony Orchestra / Charles Dutoit. Decca.

1984
Orchestral (Record of the Year) – Mahler: Symphony No. 9. Berlin Philharmonic Orchestra, Herbert von Karajan. Deutsche Grammophon.
Chamber – Beethoven: Late String Quartets Opp. 127, 130, 131, 132, 133 & 135. Lindsay Quartet. ASV.
Choral – Mozart: Requiem. Margaret Price. Trudeliese Schmidt. Francisco Araiza. Theo Adam. Dresden State Orchestra, Peter Schreier. Philips.
Concerto – Mozart: Piano Concertos No 15, 16. Murray Perahia. English Chamber Orchestra. CBS.
Contemporary – Brian Ferneyhough: Quartet No. 2 / Jonathan Harvey: Quartet No. 2 / Carter: Quartet No. 3/ Arditti Quartet (Irvine Arditti, Levine Andrade, Lennox MacKenzie, Rohan de Saram). RCA.
Early Music (Baroque) – Bach: Kammermusik. Musica Antiqua Köln, Reinhard Goebel. Archiv.
Early Music (Medieval and Renaissance) – Dunstable: Motets. Hilliard Ensemble, Paul Hiller. EMI.
Historic (Non-Vocal) – Beethoven: Piano Sonatas No. 30 in E major, Op. 109, No. 31 in A-flat major, Op. 110, No 32 in C minor Op. 111. Egon Petri. dell'Arte.
Historic (Vocal)
Instrumental – Beethoven: Piano Sonata No. 29 in B-flat major, Op. 106. Emil Gilels. Deutsche Grammophon.
Operatic – Janáček: Jenůfa. Elisabeth Söderström, Wiesław Ochman, Peter Dvorský, Eva Randová, Lucia Popp. Vienna Philharmonic. Charles Mackerras. Decca.
Solo Vocal – Strauss: Four Last Songs. Jessye Norman. Gewandhaus Orchestra / Kurt Masur. Philips.
Engineering and Production – Bax: Symphony No. 4 and Tintagel. Ulster Orchestra / Bryden Thomson. Chandos.

1982–1983
Chamber – Borodin, String Quartets nos. 1 and 2, Borodin Quartet (EMI)
Choral – Bach, Mass in B Minor, Joshua Rifkin conducting Bach Ensemble (Elektra-Nonesuch)
Concerto (Record of the Year) – Tippett, Triple Concerto, Sir Colin Davis conducting London Symphony Orchestra (Philips)
Contemporary – Boulez, Pli selon pli, Pierre Boulez conducting BBC Symphony Orchestra; solo: Phyllis Bryn-Julson (Erato)
Early-Baroque – Actéon, William Christie conducting Les Arts Florissants Vocal (Harmonia Mundi)
Early-Medieval – Hildegard of Bingen, A Feather on the Breath of God – Sequences and Hymns, Christopher Page conducting Gothic Voices (Hyperion)
Engineering – Shostakovich, Symphony No. 5, Bernard Haitink conducting Concertgebouw Orchestra (Decca)
Historical Vocal – Schubert, Historical Recordings of Lieder, various artists (HMV)
Historical Non-Vocal – Bartók, At the Piano Vol. 1, Béla Bartók (Hungaraton)
Instrumental – Liszt, Piano Sonata in B Minor, Alfred Brendel (Philips)
Operatic – The Cunning Little Vixen, Sir Charles Mackerras conducting Vienna State Opera and Vienna Philharmonic (Decca)
Orchestral – Strauss, Metamorphosen, Herbert von Karajan conducting Berlin Philharmonic Orchestra
Solo Vocal – Brahms, Lieder, Kurt Masur conducting Leipzig Gewandhaus Orchestra; solo: Jessye Norman (Philips)

1981
Operatic (Record of the Year) – Wagner, Parsifal, Herbert von Karajan conducting Deutsche Opera and Berlin Philharmonic Orchestra (Deutsche Grammophon)
Chamber – Bartók, String Quartets nos. 1–6, Tokyo Quartet (Deutsche Grammophon)
Choral – Delius, Fenby Legacy, Eric Fenby conducting Royal Philharmonia Orchestra (Unicorn-Kanchan)
Concerto – Beethoven, Violin Concerto in D minor, Carlo Maria Giulini conducting Philharmonia; solo: Perlman (EMI)
Contemporary – Tippett, King Priam, David Atherton conducting London Sinfonietta (Decca)
Early Music – Various artists, German Chamber Music, Cologne Music Antiqua (Archiv)
Engineering – Massenet, Werther, Sir Colin Davis conducting Royal Opera House Orchestra (Philips)
Historical Vocal – Various artists, Hugo Wolf Society Lieder, various artists (HMV)
Historical Non-Vocal – Brahms, Chamber Works, Busch Quartet, Rudolf Serkin, Reginald Kell and Aubrey Brain (World Records)
Instrumental – Liszt, Piano Works, Alfred Brendel (Philips)
Orchestral – Mahler, Symphony No. 9, Herbert von Karajan conducting Berlin Philharmonic Orchestra (Deutsche Grammophon)
Solo Vocal – Liszt, Lieder, Dietrich Fischer-Dieskau and Daniel Barenboim (Deutsche Grammophon)

1980
Operatic (Record of the Year) – Janáček, From the House of the Dead, Sir Charles Mackerras conducting Vienna State Opera and Vienna Philharmonic (Decca
Chamber – Brahms, Piano Quintet, Quartetto Italiano; solo: Maurizio Pollini (Deutsche Grammophon)
Choral – Handel, L'Allegro, il Penseroso, John Eliot Gardiner conducting Monteverdi Choir (Erato)
Concerto – Ravel, Piano Concerto in G, Lorin Maazel conducting French National Orchestra; solo: Jean-Philippe Collard (HMV)
Contemporary – Birtwistle, Punch and Judy, David Atherton conducting London Sinfonietta (Etcetera)
Early Music – C. P. E. Bach, Sinfonias, Trevor Pinnock conducting The English Concert (Archiv)
Engineering – Debussy, Nocturnes, Jeux, Bernard Haitink conducting Concertgebouw Orchestra (Philips)
Historical Vocal – Various artists, Gramophone Co. Recordings, Fernando De Lucia (Rubini)
Historical Non-Vocal – Bartók, Contrasts for Clarinet, Violin and Piano, Béla Bartók, Joseph Szigeti and Benny Goodman (Sony)
Instrumental – Brahms, Piano Sonatas nos. 1 and 2, Krystian Zimerman (Deutsche Grammophon)
Orchestral – Debussy, Nocturnes, Jeux, Bernard Haitink conducting Concertgebouw Orchestra (Philips)
Solo Vocal – Various artists, A Shropshire Lad, Graham Trew and Roger Vignoles (Meridian)

1979
Chamber (Record of the Year) – Haydn, Piano Trios, Beaux Arts Trio (Philips)
Choral – Schoenberg, Gurrelieder, Seiji Ozawa conducting Tanglewood Festival Chorus and Boston Symphony Orchestra (Philips)
Concerto – Bartók, Piano Concertos nos. 1 and 2, Claudio Abbado conducting Chicago Symphony Orchestra; solo: Maurizio Pollini (Deutsche Grammophon)
Contemporary – Maxwell Davies, Symphony No. 1, Simon Rattle conducting Philharmonia Orchestra (Decca)
Early Music – Mozart, Symphonies Vol. 3, Christopher Hogwood conducting Academy of Ancient Music (L'Oiseau-Lyre)
Engineering – Debussy, Images pour orchestre, Prélude à l'après-midi d'un faune, André Previn conducting London Symphony Orchestra (EMI)
Historical – Various artists, Record of Singing Vol. 2, various artists (HMV)
Instrumental – Bach, Organ Works Vol. 3, Peter Hurford (Argo)
Operatic – Berg, Lulu, Pierre Boulez conducting Paris Opera Orchestra (Deutsche Grammophon)
Orchestral – Debussy, Images pour orchestre, Prélude à l'après-midi d'un faune, André Previn conducting London Symphony Orchestra (EMI)
Solo Vocal – Grechaninov, etc., Five Children's Songs, Elisabeth Söderström and Vladimir Ashkenazy (Decca)

1978
Chamber – Bartók, Sonata for 2 Pianos; Debussy, En Blanc; Mozart, Andante With 5 Variations for Piano, Martha Argerich, Stephen Bishop-Kovacevich, Willy Goudswaard and Michael de Roo (Philips)
Choral – Handel, Dixit Dominus, John Eliot Gardiner conducting Monteverdi Choir and Orchestra (Erato)
Concerto – Prokofiev, Piano Concerto No. 1, Simon Rattle conducting London Symphony Orchestra; solo: Andrei Gavrilov (EMI Studio Plus)
Contemporary – Webern, Complete Works, Pierre Boulez conducting Juilliard String Quartet and London Symphony Orchestra (Sony)
Early Music – Handel, Acis and Galatea, John Eliot Gardiner conducting English Baroque Soloists (Archiv)
Historical – Gluck, Orfeo ed Euridice, Charles Bruck conducting Netherlands Opera Chorus and Orchestra (EMI)
Instrumental – Liszt, Piano Works, Alfred Brendel (Philips)
Operatic (Record of the Year) – Puccini, La fanciulla del West, Zubin Mehta conducting Royal Opera House Choir and Orchestra (Deutsche Grammophon)
Orchestral – Mozart, Symphonies nos. 25 and 29, Benjamin Britten conducting English Chamber Orchestra (Decca)
Solo Vocal – Chausson, Poeme; Duparc, Melodies, André Previn conducting London Symphony Orchestra; solo: Janet Baker (HMV)

1977
Chamber – Shostakovich, String Quartets nos. 4 and 12, Fitzwilliam Quartet (Decca)
Choral – Elgar, Coronation Ode; Parry, I Was Glad, Philip Ledger conducting Kings College Choir and New Philharmonia Orchestra (EMI)
Concerto – Mozart, Piano Concerto No. 22, Neville Marriner conducting Academy of St Martin in the Fields; solo: Alfred Brendel (Philips)
Contemporary – Berio, Concerto for Two Pianos, Pierre Boulez conducting London Symphony Orchestra and Luciano Berio conducting BBC Symphony Orchestra (RCA Red Seal)
Early Music – Dowland, Lute Works, Julian Bream (RCA Red Seal)
Historical – Various artists, Record of Singing, various artists (HMV)
Instrumental – Beethoven, Piano Sonatas nos. 27–32, Maurizio Pollini (Deutsche Grammophon)
Operatic (Record of the Year) – Janáček, Kata Kabanova'', Charles Mackerras conducting Vienna State Opera and Vienna Philharmonic (Decca)
Orchestral – Elgar, Symphony No. 1, Sir Adrian Boult conducting London Philharmonic Orchestra (EMI)
Solo Vocal – Shostakovich, Suite, Six Songs to Lyrics, etc., Maxim Shostakovich conducting Moscow Radio Symphony Orchestra (HMV Melodiya)

References

External links

British music awards
Classical music awards
Classical music lists